Granddaughter of Ice is a 1980 Soviet fantasy film directed by Boris Rytsarev.

Plot 
The film tells about the Snow Maiden, who falls in love with a country potter so much that she wants to become an ordinary girl and marry him. But it was not so simple.

Cast 
 Svetlana Orlova
 Andrey Gradov
 Lyudmila Shagalova
 Boris Saburov
 Albert Filozov
 Valeriy Dolzhenkov as Timoschka
 Olga Grigoreva as Nastassya
 Vladimir Nikitin as Brautwerber
 Vladimir Druzhnikov

References

External links 
 

1980 films
1980s Russian-language films
Soviet fantasy films
1980 fantasy films